The Swedish Academy, founded in 1786 by King Gustav III, is one of the Royal Academies of Sweden. Its 18 members, who are elected for life, comprise the highest Swedish language authority. Outside Scandinavia, it is best known as the body that chooses the laureates for the annual Nobel Prize in Literature, awarded in memory of the donor Alfred Nobel.

History 
The Swedish Academy was founded in 1786 by King Gustav III. Modelled after the Académie française, it has 18 members. It is said that Gustaf III originally intended there to be twenty members, half the number of those in the French Academy, but eventually decided on eighteen because the Swedish expression De Aderton – 'The Eighteen' – had such a fine solemn ring. The academy's motto is "Talent and Taste" ("Snille och Smak" in Swedish). The academy's primary purpose is to further the "purity, strength, and sublimity of the Swedish language" ("Svenska Språkets renhet, styrka och höghet") (Walshe, 1965).

The building now known as the Stockholm Stock Exchange Building was built for the bourgeoisie. The bottom floor was used as a trading exchange (this later became the stock exchange), and the upper floor was used for balls, New Year's Eve parties, etc. When the academy was founded, the ballroom was the biggest room in Stockholm that could be heated and thus used in the winter, so the King asked if he could borrow it.

The academy has had its annual meeting there every year since, attended by members of the Swedish royal family. However, it was not until 1914 that the academy gained permanent use of the upper floor as their own. It is here that the academy meets and, amongst other business, announces the names of Nobel Prize laureates. This task arguably makes the academy one of the world's most influential literary bodies.

Members are elected by a secret ballot in the Academy and before the result is made public it must be submitted to the Academy's Patron, the King of Sweden, for his approval. Members of the Academy include writers, linguists, literary scholars, historians and a prominent jurist. Initially writers were in the minority in the Academy, but during the twentieth century the number of writers grew to represent more than half of The Eighteen. The Swedish Academy have a long history of being a heavily male dominated institution, but the Academy has recently moved towards better equality. Since 20 December 2019 one third of the chairs belong to female Academy members.

Prior to 2018 it was not possible for members of the academy to resign; membership was for life, although the academy could decide to exclude members. This happened twice to Gustaf Mauritz Armfelt, who was excluded in 1794, re-elected in 1805 and excluded again in 1811. In 1989, Werner Aspenström, Kerstin Ekman and Lars Gyllensten chose to stop participating in the meetings of the academy, over its refusal to express support for Salman Rushdie when Ayatollah Khomeini condemned him to death for The Satanic Verses, and in 2005, Knut Ahnlund made the same decision, as a protest against the choice of Elfriede Jelinek as Nobel laureate for 2004. On 25 November 2017, Lotta Lotass said in an interview that she had not participated in the meetings of the academy for more than two years and did not consider herself a member any more.

Dag Hammarskjöld's former farm at Backåkra, close to Ystad in southern Sweden, was bought in 1957 as a summer residence by Hammarskjöld, then Secretary-General of the United Nations (1953–1961). The south wing of the farm is reserved as a summer retreat for the 18 members of the Swedish Academy, of which Hammarskjöld was a member.

On 11 April 2019, the academy published its financial statements for the first time in its history. According to it, the academy owned financial assets worth 1.58 billion Swedish kronor at the end of 2018 (equal to $170M, €150M, or £130M).

The Swedish King is the only person who, apart from the members, has the right to attend the meetings of the academy. On 3 March 2022 the Swedish King attended a weekly academy meeting, the first time a Swedish king has done so in over 200 years.

2018 controversies 
In April 2018, three members of the academy board resigned in response to a sexual-misconduct investigation involving author Jean-Claude Arnault, husband of board member Katarina Frostenson. Arnault was accused by at least 18 women of sexual assault and harassment; he denied all accusations. The three members resigned in protest over the lack of appropriate action against Arnault. Two former permanent secretaries, Sture Allén and Horace Engdahl, called the current leader, Sara Danius, a weak leader.

On 10 April, Danius resigned from her position with the academy, bringing the number of empty seats to four. Frostenson voluntarily agreed to withdraw from participating in the academy, bringing the total of withdrawals to five. Because two other seats were still vacant after the Rushdie affair, this left only 11 active members. The scandal was widely seen as damaging to the credibility of the Nobel prize in Literature and the authority of the academy. "With this scandal you cannot possibly say that this group of people has any kind of solid judgment," noted Swedish journalist Björn Wiman.

On 27 April 2018, the Swedish Economic Crime Authority opened a preliminary investigation regarding financial crime linked to an association run by Arnault and Frostenson, which had received funding from the academy.

On 2 May 2018, the Swedish King amended the rules of the academy and made it possible for members to resign. The new rules also state that a member who has been inactive in the work of the academy for more than two years can be asked to resign. Following the new rules, the first members to formally be granted permission to leave the academy and vacate their chairs were Kerstin Ekman, Klas Östergren, Sara Stridsberg and Lotta Lotass.

On 4 May 2018, the Swedish Academy announced that following the preceding internal struggles the Nobel laureate for literature selected in 2018 would be postponed until 2019, when two laureates would be selected.

The Academy's dictionaries 
In pursuance of its goals of maintaining and strengthening the Swedish language, the Academy publishes three dictionaries. The first is a one-volume spelling dictionary called Svenska Akademiens ordlista (SAOL), which is in its 14th edition. The second is a multi-volume dictionary (38 volumes so far), edited on principles similar to those of the Oxford English Dictionary, entitled Svenska Akademiens Ordbok (SAOB), the first volume of which was published in 1898 and, as of 2017, work has progressed to words beginning with the letter "Ä" (which is the second-to-last letter of the alphabet). The third is a two-volume dictionary edited at Gothenburg University and titled Svensk ordbok utgiven av Svenska Akademien ('Swedish dictionary published by the Swedish Academy'); it covers modern Swedish and includes pronunciations, etymologies etc, as well as definitions and some examples.  In addition to printed publications, all three dictionaries are also available to access free of charge online at svenska.se.

In addition to the dictionaries the Academy has also published a four-volume grammar of the Swedish language (Svenska Akademiens grammatik, SAG) aimed at researchers, linguists and university students among others, as well as a single-volume counterpart for those requiring something less comprehensive (Svenska Akademiens språklära, SAS).

Awards and prizes 
Since 1901, the Swedish Academy has annually decided who will be the laureate for the Nobel Prize in Literature, awarded in memory of the donor Alfred Nobel.

The Swedish Academy annually awards nearly 50 different prizes and scholarships, most of them for domestic Swedish authors. Common to all is that they are awarded without competition and without application. The Dobloug Prize, the largest of these at $40,000, is a literature prize awarded for Swedish and Norwegian fiction.

The Big Prize 
Swedish: Stora Priset, literally the Big Prize, was instituted by King Gustav III. The prize, which consists of a single gold medal, is the most prestigious award that can be awarded by the Swedish Academy. It has been awarded to, among others, Selma Lagerlöf (1904 and 1909), Herbert Tingsten (1966), Astrid Lindgren (1971), Evert Taube (1972) and Tove Jansson (1994).

Other awards 
The academy awards around 50 prizes each year. A person does not have to apply nor compete for the prizes.

Full list of awards (in Swedish)

Current members 

The current members of the Swedish Academy listed by seat number:

Permanent secretaries

See also 
 List of members of the Swedish Academy
 List of language regulators
 Bellman Prize
 Dobloug Prize
 Backåkra

References

Other sources 
 Walshe, Maurice O'Connell (1965). "Introduction to the Scandinavian Languages",  Andre Deutsch Ltd., 1st edition, p. 57

External links 

  
  
 SAOL on the web – Free
 SAOB on the web – Free

 
1786 establishments in Sweden
Organizations established in 1786